In spectral geometry, the Rayleigh–Faber–Krahn inequality, named after its conjecturer, Lord Rayleigh, and two individuals who independently proved the conjecture, G. Faber and Edgar Krahn, is an inequality concerning the lowest Dirichlet eigenvalue of the Laplace operator on a bounded domain in , . It states that the first Dirichlet eigenvalue is no less than the corresponding Dirichlet eigenvalue of a Euclidean ball having the same volume. Furthermore, the inequality is rigid in the sense that if the first Dirichlet eigenvalue is equal to that of the corresponding ball, then the domain must actually be a ball.

More generally, the Faber–Krahn inequality holds in any Riemannian manifold in which the isoperimetric inequality holds. In particular, according to Cartan–Hadamard conjecture, it should hold in all simply connected manifolds of nonpositive curvature.

See also
 Hearing the shape of a drum

References 

Elliptic partial differential equations
Riemannian geometry
Spectral theory